Gorden Bond Kelley (June 11, 1938 – October 22, 2015) was an American football linebacker in the National Football League for the San Francisco 49ers and the Washington Redskins.  He played college football at the University of Georgia.  He was married to Charlotte and had two children, son Gordon Jr. and daughter Mary.  The son played college football in Virginia.  After retirement, he worked in real estate as well as owning a furniture store in Ocean Ridge, Florida.

References

1938 births
2015 deaths
American football linebackers
Edmonton Elks players
Georgia Bulldogs football players
People from Decatur, Georgia
San Francisco 49ers players
Sportspeople from DeKalb County, Georgia
Washington Redskins players